The 1864–65 New South Wales colonial election was held between 22 November 1864 and 10 January 1865. This election was for all of the 72 seats in the New South Wales Legislative Assembly and it was conducted in 52 single-member constituencies, six 2-member constituencies and two 4-member constituencies, all with a first past the post system. The previous parliament of New South Wales was dissolved on 10 November 1864 by the Governor, Sir John Young, on the advice of the Premier, James Martin. Suffrage was limited to adult white males.

There was no recognisable party structure at this election; instead the government was determined by a loose, shifting factional system.

Key dates

Results
{{Australian elections/Title row
| table style = float:right;clear:right;margin-left:1em;
| title        = New South Wales colonial election, 22 November 1864 – 10 January 1865
| house        = Legislative Assembly
| series       = New South Wales colonial election
| back         = 1860
| forward      = 1869–70
| enrolled     = 111,302
| total_votes  = 66,775
| turnout %    = 51.40
| turnout chg  = +8.49
| informal     = 156
| informal %   = 0.36
| informal chg = +0.19
}}

|}

References

See also
 Members of the New South Wales Legislative Assembly, 1864–1869
 Candidates of the 1864–65 New South Wales colonial election

1864-65
1864 elections in Australia
1865 elections in Australia
1860s in New South Wales
November 1864 events
December 1864 events
January 1865 events